Uptown Festival is the first album credited to American R&B group Shalamar, released in 1977 on the Soul Train label. The album was in fact recorded by session singers. It peaked at #22 on the US R&B chart and #48 on the Billboard Albums chart.

The title track, "Uptown Festival," was recorded at Ike & Tina Turner's Bolic Sound studio. It's a medley of ten Motown classics sung over a 1970s disco beat. The single was a hit in both the US and the UK.

Singles 
Two singles were released from the album:

 "Uptown Festival (Part 1)" (US Hot 100 #25, US R&B #10, Australia #20, UK #30)
 "Ooo Baby Baby" (US R&B #59)

Track listing

Charts

References

External links

Shalamar albums
1977 debut albums